Old Street is a street in London, United Kingdom. The street is the namesake for the following: 
 Old Street Roundabout, a major road junction
 Old Street station, a railway station in the middle of Old Street Roundabout

Old street may also refer to:

East Asia 

In Chinese-speaking countries, the term lǎojiē, directly translated as "old street", refers to a historic district. They may be a single street, or a cluster of buildings in a neighborhood. Notable places with this name include:
 Anping Old Street, Tainan, Taiwan
 Daxi Old Street, Taoyuan, Taiwan
 Gaochun Old Street, Nanjing
 Nanzhuang Old Street, Miaoli, Taiwan
 Qibao Old Street, Shanghai
 Sanxia Old Street, New Taipei, Taiwan
 Shenkeng Old Street, New Taipei, Taiwan
 Tamsui Old Street, New Taipei, Taiwan
 Toucheng Old Street, Yilan, Taiwan
 Wulai Old Street, New Taipei, Taiwan
 Xinhua Old Street, Tainan, Taiwan

Other 
 Old Street drill hall, Ashton-under-Lyne